Mahendra Shukla is a former Indian first-class cricketer.

Despite having a first-class career spanning just seven games, Shukla appeared for three teams during his career, which started during the 1947-48 season for Holkar.

Having appeared in three Ranji trophy matches in his debut season, he played a single game in 1948-49 for United Provinces, before moving, in 1949-50, to his final team, Uttar Pradesh.  He completed his Mechanical Engineering from Banaras Hindu University.

From eleven first-class innings, Shukla top-scored with 90 against Assam, his only half-century in first-class cricket.

After retiring from Indian Oil Corporation, Mahendra Shukla was residing in Navi Mumbai until his death on 10 September 2017.

External links
Mahendra Shukla at CricketArchive 
Ranji Trophy stats

Images

Indian cricketers
Holkar cricketers
United Provinces cricketers
Uttar Pradesh cricketers
Indian Oil Corporation
Banaras Hindu University alumni